PT Badak Bontang Airport (IATA: BXT, ICAO: WALC formerly WRLC), is a private airport in Bontang, East Kalimantan, Indonesia. This airport is managed by PT. Badak NGL. Its distance from the town center is about 1 kilometer.

PT Badak Bontang Airport is served by one de Havilland Canada Dash-7 and one ATR-42-500 Indonesia Air Transport. The Dash-7 is owned by PT. Pupuk Kalimantan Timur (PK-PKT), and the ATR-42-500 is chartered by PT. Badak NGL (PK-THT). PK-THT is the world's largest LNG producer.

Airlines and destinations

Accidents and incidents
 In November 1982, Indonesian Aerospace 212-100 PK-DCR of Deraya Air Taxi and PT Pupuk Kaltim was damaged when approaching Bontang. There were no fatalities.

References

External links 

PT Badak Bontang Airport - Indonesia Airport global website

Airports in East Kalimantan
Bontang